John Gray House may refer to:

Rev. John H. Gray House, Eutaw, Alabama, listed on the National Register of Historic Places (NRHP)
John Gray House (Port Matilda, Pennsylvania), listed on the NRHP in Centre County, Pennsylvania
John P. and Stella Gray House, Coeur d'Alene, Idaho, listed on the NRHP in Kootenai County, Idaho
John Gray Springhouse, Elkton, Kentucky, listed on the NRHP in Todd County, Kentucky